The 2016–17 Hobart Hurricanes WBBL season was the second in the team's history. Coached by Julia Price and captained by Heather Knight, the team competed in the WBBL02 competition.

At the conclusion of the group stage, the Hurricanes team was fourth on the ladder.  The Hurricanes then lost to eventual WBBL|02 champions the Sydney Sixers in a semi-final to finish in equal third place (with the Brisbane Heat).

Squad
The following is the Hurricanes women squad for WBBL|02.  Players with international caps are listed in bold.

Sources

Ladder

Fixtures

Group stage

Knockout phase

Semi-final

References

2016–17 Women's Big Bash League season by team
Hobart Hurricanes (WBBL)